The Südkreis-Liga  (English: Southern district league) was the highest association football league in the German Kingdom of Württemberg, Grand Duchy of Baden, the Province of Hohenzollern and Alsace-Lorraine from 1908 to 1918. The league was disbanded with the introduction of the Kreisliga Südwest and Kreisliga Württemberg in 1919.

History
The league was formed in a move to improve the organisation of football in Southern Germany in the early 1900s. Within the structure of the Southern German football championship, four regional leagues were gradually established from 1908, these being:
 Ostkreis-Liga, covering Bavaria
 Nordkreis-Liga, covering Hesse
 Südkreis-Liga, covering Württemberg, Baden and Alsace
 Westkreis-Liga, covering the Palatinate, Lorraine and the southern Rhine Province

Until then, regional leagues had existed which send their champions to the Kreis finals and, from there, the winners went on to the Southern and German championships.

In 1908, the Südkreis-Liga was established, consisting of ten clubs and playing a home-and-away season, these clubs being:
 Phönix Karlsruhe
 Kickers Stuttgart
 1. FC Pforzheim
 Karlsruher FV
 Mannheimer FC Viktoria
 FC Alemannia Karlsruhe
 Sportfreunde Stuttgart
 Freiburger FC
 Union VfB 97 Mannheim
 FG 96 Mannheim

An eleventh club, the FV Straßburg, withdrew before the start of the season. Phönix Karlsruhe, the first league champion, qualified thereby for the Southern German championship, which it won, finishing ahead of 1. FC Nürnberg. From there, the club moved on to the German finals, where BFC Viktoria 89 could be beaten, making the club German champions.

In its second year, the league operated with only nine clubs, with the Karlsruher FV bringing home another Southern and German title to Karlsruhe. In 1909-10, the league played with ten clubs again and Karlsruher FV once more took out the league title as well as the Southern German one. In the national title round, it failed in the semi-finals, being beaten by VfB Leipzig.

In 1911-12, the league played with eleven clubs and KFV continued its dominance, reaching the German final once more but losing 1-0 to Holstein Kiel in that game.

Now with eight clubs, the 1912-13 league champion, Stuttgarter Kickers, took out the Southern championship but only managed to reach the first round of the German finals, signaling the end of the dominance of the Südkreis-Liga in Germany. In the last pre-First World War season, 1913–14, Kickers won the league title once more but in the Southern finals, rising SpVgg Fürth proved to good and went on to win the German title as well.

The war starting in August 1914 meant an end to the league, no championship was played in 1914-15 at all. In the following three seasons, regional leagues operated, like before 1908. A Südkreis championship as well as a Southern German one was played, but no national title games were held.

With the end of the war in November 1918, football came to a halt once more. Alsace ceased to be a part of Germany and the German football league system, being awarded to France. New leagues started to operate from 1919 and in the parts of the Südkreis still with Germany, the Kreisliga Südwest and Kreisliga Württemberg were formed.

National success
The Südkreis was one of the strongest regions as football was concerned in this era, taking out most Southern German championships at the time. On national level, the clubs from there were quite successful, too.

Southern German championship
Qualified teams and their success:
 1909: Phönix Karlsruhe, Southern German champions
 1910: Karlsruher FV, Southern German champions
 1911: Karlsruher FV, Southern German champions
 1912: Karlsruher FV, Southern German champions
 1913: Stuttgarter Kickers, Southern German champions
 1914: Stuttgarter Kickers, 3rd
 1916: Freiburger FC, Semi-finals
 1917: Stuttgarter Kickers, Southern German champions
 1918: Union Stuttgart, Runners-up

German championship
Qualified teams and their success:
 1909: Phönix Karlsruhe, German champions
 1910: Karlsruher FV, German champions
 1911: Karlsruher FV, Semi-finals
 1912: Karlsruher FV, Runners-up
 1913: Stuttgarter Kickers, First round

Winners and runners-up of the Südkreis-Liga and championship

Placings in the Südkreis-Liga  1908–14

References

Sources
 Fussball-Jahrbuch Deutschland  (8 vol.), Tables and results of the German tier-one leagues 1919-33, publisher: DSFS
 Kicker Almanach,  The yearbook on German football from Bundesliga to Oberliga, since 1937, published by the Kicker Sports Magazine
 Süddeutschlands Fussballgeschichte in Tabellenform 1897-1988  History of Southern German football in tables, publisher & author: Ludolf Hyll

External links
 The Gauligas  Das Deutsche Fussball Archiv 
 German league tables 1892-1933  Hirschi's Fussball seiten
 Germany - Championships 1902-1945 at RSSSF.com

1
1908 establishments in Germany
1918 disestablishments in Germany
Football competitions in Baden-Württemberg
20th century in Baden-Württemberg
Southern German football championship
Football competitions in Alsace-Lorraine
Sports leagues established in 1908
Ger